The Danville Dashers were a semi-professional ice hockey team that played in Danville, Illinois, United States, at the David S. Palmer Arena.

Originally, the Dashers played in the Continental Hockey League (CnHL) from 1981 to 1986. In their first season, they were coached by Gordie Gibson and were regular season and Wal-Mar playoff champions in 1981–82. William "Chick" Chalmers was then hired as the next head coach and eventually led the team to another playoff championship in 1984. Ken Wilson then moved to Danville and became general manager and head coach from 1984 to 1986.

The CnHL folded in 1986 and Danville was one of three CnHL teams that founded a new league, the All-American Hockey League. Simultaneously, Danville rebranded to the Danville Fighting Saints. With former NHL player Lindsay Middlebrook in goal, the Saints were league champions in the 1986–87 season. Their coach for the 1987–88 season was Robert Nagy.

Season-by-season record

References

External links
 Dashers statistics
 Fighting Saints statistics

Defunct ice hockey teams in Illinois
Dashers CnHL
1981 establishments in Illinois
1989 disestablishments in Illinois
Ice hockey clubs established in 1981
Ice hockey clubs disestablished in 1989